The Bradford League was a football competition based in England. It sat at level 14 of the English football league system. The league was a feeder to the West Riding County Amateur Football League – in 2006 Dudley Hill Athletic made the step up to the higher level. It was sponsored by the local newspaper the Telegraph and Argus and was known as the T&A League. It was previously sponsored by another local company, Grattan plc. The league contained a number of pub teams.  The league closed down in 2010.

Former champions

1999–00 – Fagley
2000–01 – Brook Crompton
2001–02 – South Bradford
2002–03 – South Bradford
2003–04 – Woodlands
2004–05 – West Horton
2005–06 – West Horton
2006–07 – IMS Celtic
2007–08 – Bradford All Stars
2008–09 – Fairbank United
2009–10 – TVR United

References

 
Defunct football leagues in England
Sport in Bradford
Football in West Yorkshire